Taurus One, Taurus 1, Taurus I, or variation, may refer to:

 "Taurus 1" (song), a 1980 song by Mike Oldfield off the album QE2 (album)
 Moog Taurus I, a music synthesizer
 Bristol Taurus I, a radial aircraft engine
 Ford Taurus generation one, a passenger sedan car
 Taurus 1 rocket, the first Taurus series rocket, later renamed to Minotaur-C

See also

 Taurus (disambiguation)